Charles Busby may refer to:

 Charles Busby (architect) (1786–1834), English architect
 Charles Busby (politician) (born 1963), American politician